Timoteij were a Swedish ethnopop group established in 2008. The group originally consisted of Cecilia Kallin, Bodil Bergström, Elina Thorsell, and Johanna Pettersson, all born in 1991. Pettersson left the group in 2014.

History 
Timoteij participated in the Swedish Melodifestivalen 2010 with their debut single "Kom" written by Karl Eurén, Gustav Eurén and Niklas Arn. "Kom" finished first in the third semi-final of "Melodifestivalen" and fifth in the national final.

They participated again in Melodifestivalen 2012 with their single "Stormande hav". However, they failed to make it to the finals. In Spring 2014, Johanna Pettersson left the group to focus on a dancing career.

In 2014, Johanna Pettersson left the band turning Timoteij into a trio." Their first single as a trio was "Wildfire".

In 2015 Bodil, Elina and Cecilia, along with Cecilia's brother Charles Kallin performed as backup singers and guitarists for fellow Swedish singer Erika Selin in Eurosong 2015 with "Break Me Up", coming third overall in the Final 5.

Prior to breaking up in 2016, the trio released the EP Under Our Skin.

Members

Cecilia Kallin
Born on 4 December 1991, she is from Falköping. In addition to being a vocalist in the band, she was also a guitarist.

In 2015, Kallin participated in the national selection that selected the act to represent Ireland in the Eurovision Song Contest 2015 with the song "Break Me Up". Although credited mainly to Erika Selin, the performance also included Cecilia Kallin and her brother Charles Kallin as accompanying guitarists and backup vocalists. The song was picked as one of the Top 5 for the live show final held on 27 February 2015 on The Late Late Show. The song placed third overall in the selection process, with "Playing with Numbers" by Molly Sterling winning to represent Ireland.

In 2018, Kallin released her first solo single "Runaway", accompanied by an official music video. followed by a second single "Don't You Wanna Know", which was released in the same year. The song was co-written by Kallin herself, along with Tony Nilsson. Swedish production duo 528 featured her vocals in the song "Unfeather".

Bodil Bergström

Born 20 June 1991, she is from Skara. In addition to being a vocalist for the band, she was the band's accordion player.

Elina Thorsell

Born 27 April 1991, she is from Skövde. In addition to being one of the band's vocalists, she was also the flute player in the band.

Johanna Pettersson
Born on 31 May 1991, she is from Tibro. In addition to being a vocalist in the band, she was the band's violinist. Johanna Pettersson left Timoteij in early 2014. She declared: "I'm Leaving Timoteij! After four amazing years the time has now come for me to move on to work on my dancing career. I’m excited about what the future holds for me, and I’m starting off with spreading my wings in New York this summer."

Discography

Albums

EPs

Singles

See also 
 Swedish folk music
 Sarek

References

External links 

 

Musical groups disestablished in 2016
Musical groups established in 2008
Pop-folk music groups
Swedish pop music groups
Melodifestivalen contestants of 2012
Melodifestivalen contestants of 2010